The Freedom Center is the Transportation Security Administration (TSA) operation center. 

The facility was renamed the "Freedom Center" on June 21, 2007.

References

Transportation Security Administration